George Swinburne (3 February 1861 – 4 September 1928) was an Australian engineer, politician and philanthropist. He founded the institution which later became Swinburne University of Technology.

Early life
Swinburne was born at Paradise, near Newcastle-on-Tyne, England, son of Mark William Swinburne, and his wife Jane née Coates. Mark Swinburne was a draughtsman in the Armstrong works at Elswick, working for a salary of 27s. a week. Later Mark Swiburne established his own business in 1892 as a brass-founder, engineer and coppersmith. Mark married Jane in 1860.

George Swinburne was educated at the Royal Grammar School, Newcastle, and in 1874 became apprenticed to chemical merchants, J. Williamson & Co. After completing his apprenticeship he became a clerk in the same business (1880–82), and studied engineering in the evening, shorthand and German before beginning work in the morning, and joined a debating society. On Sundays Swinburne taught a class in a Methodist Sunday school; he had music lessons and was an avid reader.

Early career
In September 1882 Swinburne went to London, finding employment in the gas and mechanical engineering business of his uncle, John Coates. In April 1885, Swinburne was taken into partnership and was able to put £300 of his own savings into the business. Swinburne's chief recreation was music and in June 1885 he was one of the choristers at the Handel festival held in the Crystal Palace. Politically, Swinburne was an ardent Gladstonian Liberal, in 1886 he became election agent for the Liberal candidate for St Pancras South, Sir Julian Goldsmid, 3rd Baronet, who was elected after a strenuous campaign. Swinburne found electioneering a great strain, "a game not worth playing—ended in weariness, sleepless nights and restless days". In December 1885 Coates had gone to Melbourne to start a business, Swinburne was left in charge in London. Coates found the prospects so good that Swinburne followed him and arrived in November 1886.

Australia
Swinburne's role was to secure contracts for erecting gas plants for the firm of John Coates and Company. In 1887 the Melbourne Hydraulic Power Company was formed, supplying power to city buildings. In 1888 a similar company was established in Sydney.
Swinburne was engineer and manager of the Melbourne company until 1897. Swinburne visited England in 1891 and fortunately withdrew most of his capital from Melbourne to help his father and brother to start a business; in doing so he practically escaped the effects of the end of the land boom and the bank crisis of 1893. Swinburne visited the United States and Europe in 1897 studying the development of electricity in competition with gas. He decided that each would have its own place.

Politics
Swinburne was elected a member of the Hawthorn municipal council in 1898 and in 1902 became mayor. Also in 1902, Swinburne became member for the Electoral district of Hawthorn in the Victorian Legislative Assembly, and sat as a supporter of W. H. Irvine. There had been a severe drought in Australia and the policy speech foreshadowed "important works for the conservation and distribution of water in the arid areas". The earlier experiments initiated by Alfred Deakin had not really been successful, and it was clear that their organization and principles would need careful revision. Swinburne had studied Victorian irrigation and realised the huge cost of storing the winter and spring rains for use summer; he believed that water charges should take the form of a rate payable, not only by those who used the water, but by all whose land was benefitted by irrigation. In November 1903 Irvine's health was so seriously affected by over-work that he was compelled to resign the premiership, and Thomas Bent who succeeded him gave Swinburne the portfolio of minister of water-supply (1904–08). Swinburne was in England at the time but he collected all the available literature on the subject and studied it on the voyage out. He then visited the irrigation settlement with leading officers of his department. The whole problem was full of complications, but Swinburne was able to have the drafting of the water bill begun in June 1904. It involved the appointment of the State Rivers and Water Supply Commission of Victoria to undertake the control and management of all state water. The bill passed through the assembly but was not passed by the Victorian Legislative Council. Swinburne had to travel through the country and to try and convert the opponents to the bill. In 1905 it passed the assembly again and Swinburne was asked to attend the Council and explain the provisions of his bill. With some amendments, the bill was finally passed by the Council. This act is said to be Swinburne's greatest achievement.

Swinburne became Minister for Agriculture in November 1904 and was also of great assistance to Bent as treasurer. As Minister for Agriculture, he was the first to realise that the most important function of the department was to educate the farmer. Swinburne was mainly responsible for the foundation of chairs in agricultural science and veterinary science at the University of Melbourne, although the latter chair has since been abandoned. Swinburne was involved in the Murray River water-sharing arrangement, his draft agreement of 1906 was remarkably close to that finally accepted in 1915. In 1907 Bent visited England and Swinburne was leader of the Assembly during his absence. After Bent's return the ministry's position weakened, and Swinburne and four other ministers resigned on 31 October 1908. During the negotiations for the reconstruction of the ministry, an advance was made to Swinburne to take over the leadership of the party, and Bent offered to retire in his favour, but Swinburne, weary from overwork, could see no way of reconciling the conflicting interests in the party and declined the offer. Swinburne also felt the strain of a motion of censure on him moved in September. Behind this motion were severe attacks made on his probity by The Age newspaper. The motion in the house was defeated by a large majority, Swinburne brought an action against The Age, and in 1909 obtained a verdict for £3250 damages and costs. The Age took the case to two higher courts but was defeated in each case. Age  proprietor David Syme had practically been a dictator in politics for many years; his mistake in this case was to attack a man who was not only perfectly honest, but had the courage to go into the witness box and the ability to withstand the cross-examination of two of the most able barristers of the day.

Retirement
On 31 July 1913 Swinburne retired from parliament to become a member of the Inter-State Commission appointed by the federal government. A host of matters was referred to the commission, and Swinburne thought it right to resign from all his directorates and practically abandon the business career in which he had been so successful. Much work was done by the commission and it is due to a suggestion made by this body that the "Advisory Council of Science and Industry" (later to become the Commonwealth Scientific and Industrial Research Organisation) was eventually established. However, a reduction of powers of the commission after a judgment of the high court resulted in Swinburne's decision to resign. Swinburne did significant World War I work and was chairman of the board of business administration of the defence department, and later was civil and finance member of the military board. In 1919 when the electricity commission was instituted Swinburne was appointed one of the four commissioners, with Sir John Monash as chairman. Swinburne resigned this position in 1925, when most of the initial difficulties of using brown coal for power generation had been surmounted.

Swinburne worked hard but he was never too busy to find time for additional activities of importance. He was a driving force in the establishment of the Eastern Suburbs technical college at Hawthorn, and one way and another contributed over £15,000 to it. Its name was afterwards changed to the Swinburne Technical College, and in 1992 it became Swinburne University of Technology. Swinburne became a member of the council of public instruction after he left state politics, and especially encouraged decentralization and technical education. He was for some years on the council of the University of Melbourne and was also one of the trustees of the public library, museums and National Gallery of Victoria. In April 1928 he became president of the trustees and much was hoped from him in this position. He had been a candidate for the Commonwealth senate in 1922 but the Labor candidates in 1922 were elected, and in 1928 he was elected to the Victorian Legislative Council. On 4 September 1928 he was in his place in the council chamber when he suddenly collapsed and died. Swinburne had married Ethel Hamer on 17 February 1890 who survived him with four daughters. Swinburne's bust by Paul Montford is at the National Gallery, Melbourne. His second daughter, Gwendolen Hamer Swinburne, published A Source Book of Australian History (1919), and Womanhood in the Life of the Nations (1923).

He was only a few years in parliament, but the influence of his work was felt long-term.

References

External links
Swinburne, George (1861–1928) biography at Encyclopedia of Australian Science
Portrait of Hon. George Swinburne, Commissioner 1919–1926.

1861 births
1928 deaths
Engineers from Melbourne
Victoria (Australia) state politicians
Members of the Victorian Legislative Assembly
Members of the Victorian Legislative Council
Australian philanthropists
People educated at the Royal Grammar School, Newcastle upon Tyne
English emigrants to Australia
Victorian Ministers for Agriculture